Coolah was a male Tasmanian devil that lived between January 1997 and May 2004. Born at the Cincinnati Zoo. Coolah was later transferred to the Toronto Zoo.

References

2004 animal deaths